Realtime Associates is an American video game developer and publisher. The company was founded in 1986 by David Warhol and a group of ex-Mattel Electronics employees originally to create games for the Intellivision system.  Since then, the company has developed and published over 90 games for  systems including the PlayStation 2, Xbox, GameCube, Saturn, PlayStation, Nintendo 64, Super NES, Genesis, Pico, Nintendo Entertainment System, TurboGrafx-16, Game Boy, Game Gear, Game Boy Color, IBM PC compatibles, and Macintosh.

In addition to its entertainment software portfolio, the company creates serious games and Games for Health, including HopeLab's Re-Mission.

Games

GameCube, PlayStation 2 and Xbox
 Intellivision Lives!

LeapPad
 LeapTrack Series 1
 LeapTrack Series 2

Game Boy Color
 All Star Baseball 2000
 Barbie: Ocean Discovery
 Caterpillar Construction Zone

Nintendo 64
 Charlie Blast's Territory
 Elmo's Letter Adventure
 Elmo's Number Journey
 Gex 64: Enter the Gecko
 Rugrats: Scavenger Hunt

PlayStation
 Battle Stations
 Casper: Friends Around the World
 Crusader: No Remorse
 Elmo's Letter Adventure
 Elmo's Number Journey
 Iron Man and X-O Manowar in Heavy Metal
 The Land Before Time: Return to the Great Valley
 Magic The Gathering: Battlemage

Sega Saturn
 Battle Stations
 Bug!
 Bug Too!
 Crusader: No Remorse
 Iron Man and X-O Manowar in Heavy Metal
 NBA Live '97
 NBA Live '98

Pico
 The Berenstain Bears' A School Day
 The Lion King: Adventures at Pride Rock
 Magic Crayons
 Pocahontas
 Ready For Reading and Ready For Math
 Richard Scarry's Busiest Day Ever
 Tails and the Music Maker

Super NES
 AAAHH!!! Real Monsters
 Beavis and Butt-head
 Captain America and The Avengers
 Q*Bert 3
 Sküljagger: Revolt of the Westicans
 Socks the Cat Rocks the Hill (unreleased)
 Warlock

Game Gear
 The Berenstain Bears' Camping Adventure
 Breakthru
 Captain America and The Avengers
 Frank Thomas Big Hurt Baseball
 NHL Hockey
 Quest for the Shaven Yak Starring Ren Hoëk & Stimpy
 Star Wars: Return of the Jedi
 WWF Monday Night Raw

Game Boy
 BreakThru!
 Captain America and The Avengers
 Dick Tracy
 Frank Thomas Big Hurt Baseball
 Out of Gas
 Q*bert
 Star Wars: Return of the Jedi
 Word Zap
 Wordtris
 WWF Monday Night Raw Wrestling

Genesis
 AAAHH!!! Real Monsters
 Barney's Hide and Seek
 The Berenstain Bears' Camping Adventure
 Normy's Beach Babe-o-Rama
 Warlock

TurboGrafx-16
 Loom

Nintendo Entertainment System
 Caesar's Palace
 Dick Tracy
Fun House
 Maniac Mansion
Monster Truck Rally
 The Rocketeer

PC
 Bug!
 Bug Too!
 Candy Land Adventure
 Iron Man and X-O Manowar in Heavy Metal
 Magic The Gathering: Battlemage
 Re-Mission
 Toon Jam
 Video Jam

References

External links

Companies based in El Segundo, California
Video game companies established in 1986
Video game companies of the United States
Video game development companies
Video game publishers
1986 establishments in California